The 3rd North Carolina Regiment was raised on 16 January 1776 at Wilmington, North Carolina for service with the Continental Army. In April, Jethro Sumner was appointed colonel. The regiment was present at the defense of Charleston in June 1776. The 3rd Regiment transferred from the Southern Department to George Washington's main army in February 1777. Assigned to Francis Nash's North Carolina Brigade in July 1777, it soon saw action at the battles of Brandywine and Germantown, and was present at White Marsh. Sumner went home ill in early 1778. Together with the 4th, 5th, and 6th North Carolina Regiments, the 3rd Regiment was reduced to a cadre and sent home to recruit up to strength on 1 June 1778. The rebuilt regiment returned to the main army in late 1778, but it was reduced to a cadre again in April 1779 and sent back to its home state. Assigned to the North Carolina Brigade, the regiment fought at the Siege of Charleston where it was captured by the British Army on 12 May 1780. The regiment was officially disbanded on 15 November 1783.

Officers
Commanders:
 Colonel Jethro Exum Sumner (1776  1779)
 Lieutenant Colonel Robert Mebane (1779  1781)
 Lieutenant Colonel John Armstrong (1781  1782)

Engagements
Companies of this unit were engaged in the following battles, sieges, and skirmishes:
 June 28, 1776, Fort Moultrie #1 in South Carolina
 September 1776, Florida Expedition 
 September 11, 1777, Battle of Brandywine Creek in Pennsylvania
 October 4, 1777, Battle of Germantown in Pennsylvania
 June 28, 1778, Battle of Monmouth in New Jersey
 March 28 to May 12, 1780, Siege of Charleston 1780 in South Carolina
 August 11, 1780, Little Lynches Creek (SC) (1 unit) in North Carolina
 August 16, 1780, Battle of Camden (SC) (1 unit) in North Carolina
 March 15, 1781, Battle of Guilford Court House (1 unit) in North Carolina
 April 25, 1781, Battle of Hobkirk's Hill in South Carolina
 September 8, 1781, Battle of Eutaw Springs in South Carolina

References

  Davis, Charles L.; A Brief History of the North Carolina Troops on the Continental Establishment in the War of the Revolution with a Register of Officers of the Same, published in 1896, Link, accessed Jan 30, 2019

External links
Bibliography of the Continental Army in North Carolina compiled by the United States Army Center of Military History

North Carolina regiments of the Continental Army
Military units and formations established in 1776
Military units and formations disestablished in 1783